Daniel Aguirre (born July 2, 1999) is an American professional soccer player who plays as a midfielder for Major League Soccer club LA Galaxy.

Career

College & Amateur
Aguirre college soccer at the University of California, Riverside, where he scored 8 goals and tallied 7 assists in 47 appearances for the Highlanders. There was no play in 2020 due to the COVID-19 pandemic.

In 2019, Aguirre also appeared for USL League Two side FC Golden State Force.

Professional
On April 7, 2021, Aguirre signed with USL Championship side LA Galaxy II. Aguirre made his professional debut on April 30, 2021, starting in a 1–0 loss to Sacramento Republic.

On July 7, 2021, Aguirre signed a one-year deal to join LA Galaxy's MLS roster.

Career statistics

Club

References

External links
 
 
 

1999 births
Living people
Association football midfielders
American soccer players
UC Riverside Highlanders men's soccer players
FC Golden State Force players
LA Galaxy players
LA Galaxy II players
Major League Soccer players
Soccer players from California
USL Championship players
USL League Two players
People from Redwood City, California